is a railway station and metro station on the Osaka Metro Nagahori Tsurumi-ryokuchi Line in Nishi-ku, Osaka, Japan.
The station has the secondary station name Kyocera Dome Osaka.

 is also a nearby station on the Hanshin Electric Railway Hanshin Namba Line near Dome-mae Chiyozaki Station.

Lines
Osaka Metro Nagahori Tsurumi-ryokuchi Line (N12: Dome-mae Chiyozaki Station)
Hanshin Electric Railway Hanshin Namba Line (HS 43: Dome-mae Station)

Layout

Dome-mae Chiyozaki Station (Osaka Metro)

The station has an island platform serving 2 tracks on the 4th basement and the platform is equipped with platform gates. On the 2nd basement, there are extra ticket machines on the opposite side of the ticket gates for the events at Osaka Dome (Kyocera Dome Osaka).

Dome-mae Station (Hanshin Railway)

This station has 5 levels underground in order to take passengers from Osaka Dome (Kyocera Dome Osaka) smoothly. The 2nd basement functions as the ticket gate area and the 5th basement contains  an island platform serving two tracks. Approximately 160 thousand bricks are used for the wall of the platform and tracks because there was formerly an Osaka Gas factory near this station which was made out of bricks. The passage to ÆON Mall Osaka Dome City is located in front of the ticket gates.

History
August 29, 1997:  on the Osaka Municipal Subway Nagahori Tsurumi-ryokuchi Line was opened for the extension of the line from Shinsaibashi to Taisho.
December 24, 2006: Osaka Dome-mae Chiyozaki Station was renamed Dome-mae Chiyozaki Station on the same day the Imazatosuji Line was opened.
March 20, 2009: Dome-mae Station was opened for the opening of the Hanshin Railway Hanshin Namba Line.
August 28, 2010: The platform gates became in use on the platform of Dome-mae Chiyozaki Station.

Surroundings
Osaka Dome (July 1, 2006–: Kyocera Dome Osaka)
Osaka Metro Co., Ltd. / Osaka City Bus Corporation
Osaka Municipal Fire Department, Nishi Fire Station
Osaka Gas Dome City Gas Building
Foleo Osaka Dome City
ÆON Mall Osaka Dome City

Buses
Dome-mae Chiyozaki (Osaka City Bus Corporation)
Route 51 for Tempozan via Bentencho-ekimae and Daisan Tottei-mae
Route 70 for Nishi-Funamachi via Taisho Kuyakusho-mae (ward office)
Route 70 Express for Nishi-Funamachi via Taisho Kuyakusho-mae (ward office)
Route 76 for Subway 
Route 90 for  / for Tsurumachi Yonchome via Taisho Kuyakusho-mae (ward office)
Route 91 for Tsurumachi Yonchome via Taisho Kuyakusho-mae (ward office)
Route 91 Express for Tsurumachi Yonchome via Taisho Kuyakusho-mae (ward office)
Route 94 for Tsurumachi Yonchome via Chishima Koen-mae
Route 98 for Taisho Kuyakusho-mae (ward office) via Shin-Chitose

References

External links 
 

Railway stations in Japan opened in 1997
Railway stations in Osaka Prefecture
Dome-mae
Osaka Metro stations